Nikolay Mikhailovich Yazykov (March 4, 1803, Simbirsk, Russian Empire – December 26, 1846, Moscow, Russian Empire) was a Russian poet and Slavophile who in the 1820s rivalled Alexander Pushkin and Yevgeny Baratynsky as the most popular poet of his generation.

Biography
Yazykov was born in Simbirsk to an old family of Russian landlords. His first verses appeared in print in 1819. For seven years (1822-1829) Yazykov studied at the philosophy department of Dorpat University, where he made himself famous with his riotously Anacreontic verse in praise of the students' merry life. For his summer vacations he went to Trigorskoye, where he met Pushkin.

After leaving Dorpat, without a degree, Yazykov lived between Moscow and his Simbirsk estate. Later in life, he became intimate with the nationalist and Slavophile circles of Moscow, which held his poetry in high esteem. Nikolay Gogol, in particular, favoured Yazykov over all other living poets. The young idealists grouping around Nikolai Stankevich, however, dismissed his work as contemptibly lacking in ideas.

Yazykov's health, undermined by the excesses of his student life, began to fail very early, and from about 1835 he was a restless wanderer from one health resort to another. The Genoese Riviera, Nice, Gastein, and other German spas are the frequent background of his later verse. His spare time was devoted to collecting Russian folk poetry, in which task he was assisted by Pyotr Kireyevsky.

Apart from Pushkin, Yazykov was also close to Nikolay Gogol and was Khomyakov's brother-in-law. It was the death of his sister that triggered Gogol's fatal depression. According to his wishes, the great novelist was buried next to the Yazykovs in the Danilov Monastery. In 1931, the remains of Yazykov, Gogol and Khomyakov were reburied at the Novodevichy Cemetery.

D.S. Mirsky compared Yazykov to Gavrila Derzhavin for "his power of seeing nature as an orgy of light and color". Pushkin once joked that the Castalian fount of which Yazykov drank ran not with water, but with champagne. Indeed, his early (and best known) poetry is devoted to the praise of wine and merrymaking, producing an effect of the almost physical intoxication and verbal rush.

See also
 List of 19th-century Russian Slavophiles

References
 

1803 births
1846 deaths
People from Ulyanovsk
People from Simbirsky Uyezd
Russian male poets
Slavophiles
Russian nationalists
19th-century poets from the Russian Empire
19th-century male writers from the Russian Empire
Burials at Novodevichy Cemetery